Streptomyces triticisoli is a bacterium species from the genus of Streptomyces which has been isolated from rhizosphereic soil of the plant Triticum aestivum.

See also 
 List of Streptomyces species

References 

triticisoli
Bacteria described in 2018